CKMQ-FM is a radio station broadcasting at 101.1 FM in Merritt, British Columbia, Canada. The station broadcasts an adult contemporary format branded as Q101.

The station was originally launched in 1970 on AM 1230 as CJNL. Merritt Broadcasting, that station's owner, received
CRTC approval to convert to the FM band in 2009, and the station was relaunched on FM on August 31 that year. Simultaneously, the company's former sister division, NL Broadcasting, received approval to launch a separate rebroadcaster of CHNL, the company's talk station in Kamloops, on CJNL's old AM frequency.

On December 22, 2020, the CRTC approved the completed acquisition of Merritt Broadcasting Ltd. to Jim Pattison Group

References

External links
Q101

Radio stations established in 1970
Kmq
Kmq
1970 establishments in British Columbia